Andrei Corneencov (born 1 April 1982) is a former Moldovan international footballer.

References

External links
 
 

Living people
1982 births
Moldovan footballers
Moldovan expatriate footballers
Moldova international footballers
Moldovan Super Liga players
FC Sheriff Tiraspol players
FC Tobol players
Expatriate footballers in Kazakhstan
People from Tiraspol
Association football midfielders